Infinito is an album by percussionist Cyro Baptista which is the second recorded by Banquet of the Spirits – Baptista, bassist Shanir Ezra Blumenkranz, keyboard player Brian Marsella, and drummer Tim Keiper – which was released on the Tzadik label in 2009.

Reception

Thom Jurek of Allmusic said "Despite the kaleidoscopic ambition of Infinito, and its sometimes frenetic pace, the album is quite accessible, and a pleasure to listen to and indulge in. If only most popular music, Brazilian or otherwise, were this colorful and exciting. This is another winner in a catalog full of them".
On All About Jazz Joel Roberts commented that "Infinito is a joyous, carnival-like treat for listeners who appreciate music without boundaries".

Track listing 
All compositions by Cyro Baptista except as indicated
 "Infinito (Coming)" (Cyro Baptista, Scott Kettner) – 5:15   
 "Batida de Côco" (Baptista, Teese Gohl, Hermeto Pascoal) – 5:51   
 "In Vitrous" – 2:54   
 "Kwanza" – 5:10   
 "Noia" – 4:30   
 "Adeus Às Filhas" – 7:11   
 "Coronation of a Slave Queen" – 1:42   
 "Cantor Cuidadoso" – 2:14   
 "Pro Flávio" – 6:43   
 "Blindman" – 2:06   
 "Infinito (Going)" – 3:52

Personnel 
Cyro Baptista – percussion, vocals 
Brian Marsella – keyboards, melodica
Shanir Ezra Blumenkranz – oud, bass
Tim Keiper – drums
Kevin Breit, Romero Lubambo – guitar
Erik Friedlander – cello
Ikue Mori – electronics
Anat Cohen – clarinet, saxophone
Skye Steele – violin
Zé Mauricio – conga
Chikako Iwahori – surdo
Sharon Epperson, Scott Kettner – alfaia
Anne Pope – caixa
Sergio Brandao – bass
Cadu Costa – acoustic guitar, bells, Rhodes piano, background vocals

References 

2009 albums
Cyro Baptista albums
Tzadik Records albums